Beauce  is a historical and traditional region of Quebec located south of Quebec City. It corresponds approximately to the regional county municipalities of Beauce-Sartigan, Beauce-Centre and La Nouvelle-Beauce, and its major communities are Saint-Georges, Sainte-Marie, Beauceville, Saint-Joseph-de-Beauce and Saint-Victor.

Name
The first record of the name goes back to 1739. "Nouvelle Beauce" (New Beauce) designated the seigneuries granted earlier along the Chaudière River and which would later become the current cities of Sainte-Marie, Saint-Joseph-de-Beauce, Beauceville, and Saint-Georges, as well as several other communities which would detach from these territories.

According to accounts from Governor Charles de Beauharnois de la Boische and Intendant Gilles Hocquart, "Beauce" was chosen by seigneurs Joseph de Fleury de La Gorgendière, Pierre de Rigaud de Vaudreuil and Thomas-Jacques Taschereau to develop the potential of colonization, as the name recalls the French Beauce, a region renowned for its wheat production. In 1829, the name represented a county extending to the Canada–US border with Maine.

Later, Beauce would also be the name of administrative, municipal, electoral, school and judicial subdivisions, sometimes with different borders. Today, residents of neighbouring regional county municipalities consider themselves "Beaucerons" (masculine) or "Beauceronnes" (feminine) because of the former administrative links. 

Historically, Beaucerons have also been known under the nickname of "Jarrets noirs" (black hocks). Travelling to Quebec City took up to one week, and because of the hilly roads and their conditions, they would often have to push their farm carts. They would get their legs dirty and arrive at the destination with their hocks black.

Black hocks actually referred to the hocks of their horses being black when they got to Quebec City because of the abundance of peaty bogs or wetlands on the journey there. Horses legs would sink up to their hocks and become covered in the muck and therefore be blackened.

Economy
Exclusively agricultural for many years, Beauce's economy slowly diversified in the first half of the 20th century through forestry, wood processing, and the leather and textile industries. In 1951, the industrial production value became for the first time superior to agriculture, likely due to strong local entrepreneurship and cheap labour. Today's economy relies especially on small and medium enterprises in the industries of furniture, food, clothing, printing and metalworking. It is known as Quebec's entrepreneurial heartland.

People linked to Beauce

 Marius Barbeau, ethnographer
 Jesse Bélanger, NHL hockey player
 Gilles Bernier, Canadian politician
 Maxime Bernier, Canadian politician
 Joseph Bolduc, Canadian politician
 Roch Carrier, author
 William Chapman, poet
 Robert Cliche, Quebec politician
 Marcel Dutil, businessman
 Clermont Pépin, composer
 Édouard Lacroix businessman and politician
 Laurent Noël, as of 2021, the oldest living Catholic bishop
 Jacques Poulin, novelist
 Marie-Philip Poulin, hockey player
 George Pozer, businessman
 Fabien Roy, Canadian politician
 Mathieu Roy, NHL hockey player
 Alex Tanguay, NHL hockey player
 Elzéar-Alexandre Taschereau, clergyman
 Henri Elzéar Taschereau, judge
 Stéphane Veilleux, NHL hockey player

See also

List of Quebec regions
Chaudière-Appalaches
Beauce-Centre Regional County Municipality
Beauce-Sartigan Regional County Municipality, Quebec
La Nouvelle-Beauce Regional County Municipality, Quebec
Tour de Beauce

Notes

Beauce, Quebec
Historical regions in Canada